Seyyed Shamseddin Vahabi is an Iranian reformist politician who served a member of the Parliament of Iran from 2000 to 2004 representing Tehran, Rey, Shemiranat and Eslamshahr.

References

1955 births
Living people
Members of the 6th Islamic Consultative Assembly
Deputies of Tehran, Rey, Shemiranat and Eslamshahr
Islamic Iran Participation Front politicians